Viktor Ivanovich Chukarin (9 November 1921 – 25 August 1984) was a Soviet gymnast. He won eleven medals including seven gold medals at the 1952 and 1956 Summer Olympics (including the individual all-around title on both occasions) and was the all-around world champion in 1954. He was the most successful athlete at the 1952 Summer Olympics.

Biography
Chukarin was born in Krasnoarmeyskoye village in Donets Governorate (modern-day Novoazovsk Raion of the Donetsk Oblast) to a Don Cossack father Ivan Evlampievich Chukarin and a Pontic Greek mother Hristina Klimentievna Lamizova. In 1924 his family moved to Mariupol where he started training in gymnastics. Later Chukarin studied at the Institute of Physical Education in Kiev.

In 1941 with the start of the Great Patriotic War he volunteered for the Red Army. He fought under the general Mikhail Kirponos. Chukarin was wounded in action, taken prisoner of war near Poltava (Kiev Cauldron) and sent to a prisoner camp in Sandbostel. He then went through a chain of 17 prisoner camps and by the time when he was freed in 1945 weighed only 40 kg. He was not accepted back to the sports institute in Kiev, and studied in a similar institution in Lviv.

In 1946 he already competed in gymnastics at the Soviet national championships; next year he finished fifth, and in 1948 won a national title. He became the all-around Soviet champion in 1949 and repeated this achievement in 1950, 1951, 1953 and 1955.

Soviet Union joined the Olympic Games in 1952 when Chukarin was 30. By then Chukarin gained much weight and was considered bulky for a gymnast. As a result, he had low scores on the floor, yet he won six medals, including the individual all-around by a margin of 0.7 points. He won five more Olympic medals at the 1956 Summer Olympics, including a silver on the floor.

He led the Soviet team to the victory at the 1954 World Championships, winning gold in the team all around and the individual all around.

In 1957 along with Larisa Latynina, Chukarin was awarded the first ever Order of Lenin given to an athlete.

He recounted his sport career in the 1955 book entitled The Road to the Peaks (Put K Vershinam). In 1961, he coached Armenian gymnastics team, and in 1963 became an assistant professor at the Lviv Institute of Physical Culture. He died in 1984 and was buried at the Lychakiv Cemetery. One of the streets in Lviv was named after him.

See also

List of multiple Olympic gold medalists
List of multiple Olympic gold medalists at a single Games
List of multiple Summer Olympic medalists
 List of Olympic medal leaders in men's gymnastics

Footnotes

References

Further reading
 Rysovanyy, Y. (1978). Sportsmen of the Ukraine in the Olympic Games, Zdorovya.

External links

List of competitive results
The Olympic Database

1921 births
1984 deaths
People from Donetsk Governorate
Soviet military personnel of World War II from Ukraine
Soviet prisoners of war
World War II prisoners of war held by Germany
Soviet male artistic gymnasts
Ukrainian male artistic gymnasts
Soviet people of Greek descent
Ukrainian people of Greek descent
Olympic gold medalists for the Soviet Union
Olympic silver medalists for the Soviet Union
Olympic bronze medalists for the Soviet Union
Olympic gymnasts of the Soviet Union
Olympic medalists in gymnastics
Gymnasts at the 1952 Summer Olympics
Gymnasts at the 1956 Summer Olympics
World champion gymnasts
Medalists at the World Artistic Gymnastics Championships
Burevestnik (sports society) athletes
Medalists at the 1956 Summer Olympics
Medalists at the 1952 Summer Olympics
Academic staff of the Lviv State University of Physical Culture
Burials at Lychakiv Cemetery
Sportspeople from Donetsk Oblast